Kemerton is a village and civil parish in Worcestershire in England.  It lies at the extreme south of the county in the local government district of Wychavon.  Until boundary changes in 1931, it formed part of neighbouring Gloucestershire, and it remains in the Diocese of Gloucester.  The northern half of the parish lies within the Cotswolds Area of Outstanding Natural Beauty.

It descends from the summit of Bredon Hill in the north, (elevation 300 m / 981 ft) to the Carrant Brook in the south (elevation 20 m / 65 ft). The north and south parish boundaries are recorded in a Saxon charter of the 8th century.

Notable historic features include Kemerton Camp, an Iron Age hill fort surmounting Bredon Hill, thought to have been vacated suddenly after a considerable battle.  On the fort's south rampart is a two-storey stone tower known as Parsons Folly (or the Tower), built in the mid-18th century by John Parsons V, MP (1732–1805), the squire of Kemerton, who reputedly wished to raise the summit of Bredon Hill to 1000 ft (305 m).  Significant buildings include the Church of St Nicholas and Kemerton Court, both of which are listed Grade II*.

The parish includes several important wildlife sites including the Kemerton Lake Nature Reserve and sections of the Bredon Hill Special Area of Conservation, which are managed by Kemerton Conservation Trust. Well known residents of Kemerton have included the anarchist publisher Charlotte Wilson and the bestselling author John Moore.

References

Bibliography
 Elrington, C.R. ed. (1968). Victoria County History: A History of the County of Gloucester, Volume VIII.

External links 
Kemerton Conservation Trust website
2001 census results
Victoria County History, A History of the County of Gloucester: volume 8 (1968)

Villages in Worcestershire